An annular solar eclipse occurred on September 1, 1951. A solar eclipse occurs when the Moon passes between Earth and the Sun, thereby totally or partly obscuring the image of the Sun for a viewer on Earth. An annular solar eclipse occurs when the Moon's apparent diameter is smaller than the Sun's, blocking most of the Sun's light and causing the Sun to look like an annulus (ring). An annular eclipse appears as a partial eclipse over a region of the Earth thousands of kilometres wide. Annularity was visible from the United States, Spanish Sahara (today's West Sahara), French West Africa (the parts now belonging to Mauritania, Mali, Burkina Faso and Ivory Coast), British Gold Coast (today's Ghana), southern tip of French Equatorial Africa (the part now belonging to R. Congo), Belgian Congo (today's DR Congo), Northern Rhodesia (today's Zambia), Portuguese Mozambique (today's Mozambique), Nyasaland (today's Malawi), and French Madagascar (today's Madagascar).

Related eclipses

Solar eclipses of 1950–1953

Saros 134

Metonic series

Notes

References

1951 9 1
1951 in science
1951 9 1
September 1951 events